Cobleskill may refer to:

United States
 Cobleskill (village), New York
 Cobleskill (town), New York
 Cobleskill Creek, New York
 Cobleskill Historic District, a national historic district located at Cobleskill in Schoharie County, New York
 SUNY Cobleskill

See also
 Cobleskill Times Journal